= Ag+-exporting ATPase =

silver-exporting ATPase

Identifiers
- EC no.: 7.2.2.15

Databases
- IntEnz: IntEnz view
- BRENDA: BRENDA entry
- ExPASy: NiceZyme view
- KEGG: KEGG entry
- MetaCyc: metabolic pathway
- PRIAM: profile
- PDB structures: RCSB PDB PDBe PDBsum
- Gene Ontology: AmiGO / QuickGO
Search
- PMC: articles
- PubMed: articles
- NCBI: proteins

In enzymology, an Ag+-exporting ATPase (EC 7.2.2.15) is an enzyme that catalyzes the chemical reaction

ATP + H_{2}O + Ag^{+}in $\rightleftharpoons$ ADP + phosphate + Ag^{+}out

The 3 substrates of this enzyme are ATP, H_{2}O, and Ag+, whereas its 3 products are ADP, phosphate, and Ag+.

This enzyme belongs to the family of hydrolases, specifically those acting on acid anhydrides to catalyse transmembrane movement of substances. The systematic name of this enzyme class is ATP phosphohydrolase (Ag+-exporting).
